This is a list of the main career statistics of professional tennis player Svetlana Kuznetsova. Since her professional debut in 2000, she has won 18 singles titles and 16 doubles titles on the WTA Tour. Some of her major titles include two Grand Slam titles in singles (2004 US Open and 2009 French Open) and two in doubles (Australian Open in 2005 and 2012). During her career, she has made 62 top 10 wins, including seven wins over world No. 1 in that moment and earned more than $25M prize money. In singles, she reached career-highest ranking of place 2, while in doubles she is former world No. 3. Playing for Russia at the Billie Jean King Cup, she won three titles, in 2004, 2007 and 2008.

Performance timelines

Only main-draw results in WTA Tour, Grand Slam tournaments, Fed Cup/Billie Jean King Cup and Olympic Games are included in win–loss records.

Singles

Current through 2021 Wimbledon Championships.

Doubles

Current through the suspension of the 2020 WTA Tour.

Grand Slam finals

Singles: 4 (2 titles, 2 runner-ups)

Doubles: 7 (2 titles, 5 runner-ups)

Tier I / Premier Mandatory & Premier 5 finals

Singles: 13 (2 titles, 11 runners-up)

Doubles: 6 (4 titles, 2 runner-ups)

WTA career finals

Singles: 42 (18 titles, 24 runners–up)

Doubles: 31 (16 titles, 15 runners–up)

Junior Grand Slam finals

Singles: 2 (2 runners-up)

Doubles: 4 (1 title, 3 runners-up)

WTA Tour career earnings
Current as of 15 November 2021

Fed Cup/Billie Jean King Cup participation 
This table is current through the 2015 Fed Cup

Singles (21–11)

Doubles (6–2)

Career Grand Slam tournament seedings

Record against other players

Record against top 10 players 
Kuznetsova's record against players who have been ranked in the top 10. Active players are in boldface.

No. 1 wins

Top 10 wins

See also
 List of Grand Slam Women's Singles champions
 WTA Tour records

Notes

References

External links

 
 
 

Tennis career statistics